The 2005 Arizona State Sun Devils football team represented Arizona State University in the 2005 NCAA Division I-A football season. It played its home games at Sun Devil Stadium in Tempe, Arizona.

The September 10 game vs. LSU was scheduled to be played at Tiger Stadium in Baton Rouge, but was moved to Tempe due to the aftermath of Hurricane Katrina in south Louisiana. LSU's Pete Maravich Assembly Center, which is just north of Tiger Stadium, was serving as a triage center for seriously injured victims from the storm. Arizona State had to grant dispensation for ESPN to televise the game, as the Pac-10 did not have a broadcast contract in place with ESPN at the time, and for the use of Southeastern Conference game officials in a Pac-10 stadium.

After a victory over the Arizona Wildcats in the Territorial Cup, Arizona State went on to play in the 2005 Insight Bowl defeating the Rutgers Scarlet Knights 45-40 for their second consecutive bowl victory in a row.

Schedule

Season summary

Arizona

References

Arizona State
Arizona State Sun Devils football seasons
Guaranteed Rate Bowl champion seasons
Arizona State Sun Devils football